G.R.I.N.D. Get Ready It's a New Day is a 2017 Philippine television drama series broadcast by GMA Network. Directed by Monti Parungao, it stars Bruno Gabriel, Jazz Ocampo, Ayra Mariano, and Benedict Campos. It premiered on August 19, 2017 on the network's Sabado Star Power sa Gabi line up replacing Midnight Horror Stories. The series concluded on October 21, 2017 with a total of 10 episodes.

Cast and characters
Lead cast
 Bruno Gabriel as Carlo Yuson
 Jazz Ocampo as Solangermina Tamara "Solanj" Martinez
 Ayra Mariano as Luisa Carmela "Lui" Gonzales
 Benedict Campos as Reynaldo "RK" Katakutan Jr.

Recurring cast
 Nanette Inventor as Lola Azon
 Joanna Marie Katanyag as Flavy

Guest cast
 Kate Alejandrino as Marty
 Jenny Miller as Loretta "Lorry" Diomendes
 Phoebe Gwenette Yor as Yuki
 Princess Ayisha as Ayisha Gonzales
 Joseph Daniel R. Aliazar as Fabio
 David Licauco as Alco
 Gileth Sandico as Amanda Gonzales
 Maureen Larrazabal as Diana Martinez
 Kim Rodriguez as Catherine "Cathy" Cruz
 Lollie Mara as Greta Yuson
 Lui Manansala as  Betchay
 Yayo Aguila as Heidi Katakutan
 Ameera Johara as Valeriano "Valerie" Maligalig
 Phytos Ramirez as Alfred
 Rosemarie Sarita as Mrs. Capistrano
 Yasser Marta as Calvin

Ratings
According to AGB Nielsen Philippines' Nationwide Urban Television Audience Measurement People in television homes, the pilot episode of G.R.I.N.D. Get Ready It's a New Day earned a 2% rating. While the final episode scored a 1.8% rating.

References

External links
 

2017 Philippine television series debuts
2017 Philippine television series endings
Filipino-language television shows
GMA Network drama series
Television shows set in the Philippines